The 2019 World Open (also known as the 2019 Yushan World Open) was a professional snooker tournament that took place between 28 October and 3 November 2019 at the Yushan Sport Centre in Yushan, China. This was the 2019 edition of the World Open, which was first held in 1982. It was the fifth ranking event of the 2019–20 season and the third tournament of the season to be held in China. The event featured a prize fund of £772,000 with the winner receiving £150,000.

Mark Williams was the defending champion, having won the 2018 event, defeating David Gilbert 10–9 in the final. Williams did not enter this year's tournament. The two finalists were Judd Trump and Thepchaiya Un-Nooh, after Trump defeated John Higgins and Un-Nooh defeated Kyren Wilson in the semi-finals by the same 6–5 scoreline. Trump won the tournament, for his 13th ranking event title, defeating Un-Nooh 10–5 in the final.

As a result of the subsequent COVID-19 pandemic that was declared later in the season, this tournament is currently the last World Snooker Tour event to have been played in China. The 2022 Hong Kong Masters was the first event played in Asia since the pandemic.

Tournament format
The 2019 World Open was a professional snooker tournament held at the Yushan Sport Centre in Yushan, China between 28 October and 3 November 2019. This was the 2019 edition of the World Open tournament, the first having been held in 1982 as the 1982 Professional Players Tournament. It was the fifth ranking event of the 2019/20 snooker season following the English Open and preceding the Northern Ireland Open. It was played as the best-of-9-frames until the semi-finals, which were best-of-11-frames, followed by a best-of-19-frames final. The event featured 64 participants from the World Snooker Tour with a single qualifying round. The World Professional Billiards and Snooker Association and World Snooker organised the World Open.

Prize fund
A total of £772,000 was awarded as prize money for the event, with the winner receiving £150,000. This was £37,000 more than the prior year's event. This meant an increase in the prize money for the last 64 losers from £4,000 to £5,000 and a rise for the last 16 from £13,000 to £13,500. The breakdown of prize money for this year was:

 Winner: £150,000
 Runner-up: £75,000
 Semi-final: £32,500
 Quarter-final: £20,000
 Last 16: £13,500
 Last 32: £8,000
 Last 64: £5,000
 Total: £772,000

Tournament summary
The 2019 World Open was held from 28 October until 3 November 2019 at the Yushan Sport Centre in Yushan, China. The defending champion, Mark Williams, declined to appear at the tournament. Qualifying for the event was held at the Barnsley Metrodome in Barnsley, South Yorkshire, from 3–5 October 2019 and in Yushan on 28 October. Neil Robertson failed to show up for his qualifying match, as he accidentally drove to Barnsley, Gloucestershire. World Snooker later made fun of him for mistaking the location of the qualifiers by sending him a map to the site of the next event—the English Open. With Robertson being forced to withdraw, Ian Burns was awarded a bye.

The world number two Ronnie O'Sullivan failed to progress through qualifying. He played Welsh player Dominic Dale, who had failed to defeat O'Sullivan after ten attempts, and lost 3–5. Dale commented the win had "only taken 27 years". The rest of the top-16 players successfully qualified for the event, with John Higgins defeating Chen Zifan and Stephen Maguire defeating Oliver Lines. Another qualifying upset was Elliot Slessor recovering from 2–4 behind to defeat two-time ranking event winner Ryan Day 5–4.

Early rounds (round one—quarter-finals)
Having won the previous event at the English Open, Mark Selby won both of his first two matches over Anthony Hamilton and Noppon Saengkham. He met 2015 World Snooker Championship winner Stuart Bingham in the last 16, where he lost 2–5. Selby won both of the opening two frames, before Bingham won the next five frames with breaks of 108, 97, 114, 104 and 117. Bingham met four-time World Champion John Higgins in the quarter-finals, losing 2–5.

The runner-up at the English Open, David Gilbert defeated Zhao Xintong 5–4, before a whitewash of Anthony McGill 5–0 and a 5–3 win over Mark Allen. Gilbert met Thailand's Thepchaiya Un-Nooh in the quarter-finals. Un-Nooh, ranked 37th in the world, led 2–1 before breaks of 100, 55 and 62 from Gilbert saw him go behind 2–4. Un-Nooh won the next three frames with breaks of 77, 66 and 96 in just 37 minutes to reach the semi-finals.

He then defeated Liang Wenbo 5–3 before another deciding frame win over Joe Perry. His quarter-final match was against Michael Holt. Had he won the event, he was the last remaining player who could qualify for the Champion of Champions event ahead of Jimmy White. Trump however, won the match 5–1, having lead at 4–0. The fourth and final semi-finalist was two-time ranking winner Kyren Wilson, who defeated, Robbie Williams 5–2, Hossein Vafaei 5–4, Jack Lisowski 5–1, and Zhou Yuelong 5–3.

Later rounds (semi-final—final)
The two semi-finals were held on 2 November 2019. Both matches were played as best-of-11 frames; both finished at 6–5. The first semi-final was played between Wilson and Un-Nooh. Wilson won the opening three frames of the match; whose highest break during this time was a 44. Un-Nooh won frame four, before Wilson won the next frame to lead 4–1. Un-Nooh won the next two frames, including a break of 74, but Wilson won frame eight to lead 5–3. Un-Nooh won the next two frames to force a deciding frame. Wilson made the first break of the final frame but made only 38 before Un-Nooh made a break of 61.

The second semi-final was a rematch of the 2019 World Snooker Championship final between Trump and Higgins. Trump took the opening frame. Higgins took the next two with two breaks of more than 50. Trump won the next four frames, including a break of 99. With neither opponent playing well, Higgins won the next three frames which also set up a deciding frame. Trump gained the first chance of frame 11, scoring a 55, before Higgins made a break of 15. Higgins missed a  into the middle pocket allowing Trump to clear the table and win the match 6–5.

The final was held between Judd Trump and Thepchaiya Un-Nooh on 3 November 2019. This was Thepchaiya's second ranking event final, having won the 2019 Snooker Shoot Out. Trump was contesting his 22nd ranking event final. The match was also a rematch of the first-round match of the World Championships, where Trump defeated Un-Nooh 10–9. Trump took an early lead in the match winning the first session 7–2. Un-Nooh won the next three frames to trail at 7–2, before Trump won three straight frames to win the championship and his 13th ranking event. The victory put Trump level with Ding Junhui into eighth for the most ranking event titles won.

Main draw
Players shown in bold denote match winners. The draw for the main competition is shown below.

Final

Qualifying
Most of the qualifying matches for the event were played between 2 and 5 October 2019 at the Barnsley Metrodome in Barnsley, England. Matches involving Judd Trump, Yan Bingtao, Luca Brecel, Ding Junhui, Lu Ning, Scott Donaldson, Ken Doherty and Ronnie O'Sullivan, were held over and played in Yushan on the opening day of the tournament main stage. All qualifying matches were best-of-9-frames.

Century breaks

Main stage centuries
A total of 64 century breaks were made by 26 players during the main event. Judd Trump's break of 104 and Wu Yize's 130 break were made in held over matches played on the first day of the main tournament.

 144, 136, 135, 129, 113, 105, 104  Judd Trump
 141, 108, 101  Ali Carter
 138, 121, 120, 117, 114, 110, 108, 104, 103  Stuart Bingham
 134, 131, 127, 106  Zhou Yuelong
 134  Zhao Xintong
 130, 129, 113, 108  Mark Allen
 130  Wu Yize
 129, 123, 103, 101  Joe Perry
 127  John Higgins
 124, 121  Michael Holt
 123, 116  Alfie Burden
 123  Lyu Haotian
 122  Ding Junhui
 119, 108, 104, 102  Kyren Wilson
 116  Chang Bingyu
 114, 110, 102, 100  David Gilbert
 114, 100  Matthew Stevens
 111  Mark Selby
 108  Ken Doherty
 107, 104  Fergal O'Brien
 104, 102, 102  Thepchaiya Un-Nooh
 104  Sam Craigie
 104  Graeme Dott
 102, 101  Mark Davis
 101  Stuart Carrington
 100  Noppon Saengkham

Qualifying stage centuries

A total of 32 century breaks were made by 32 players during the qualifying stage for the event.

 145  Jack Lisowski
 136  Mei Xiwen
 136  Kyren Wilson
 135  Jimmy Robertson
 133  Joe Perry
 131  Matthew Selt
 130  Robbie Williams
 126  Anthony McGill
 125  Michael Georgiou
 124  Ross Bulman
 123  Jimmy White
 122  Chen Feilong
 122  Mark Selby
 119  Noppon Saengkham
 119  Xu Si
 116  Michael White
 113  Thepchaiya Un-Nooh
 111  Robert Milkins
 109  Nigel Bond
 108  Barry Hawkins
 106  Mark Allen
 105  Sam Craigie
 105  Kishan Hirani
 105  Martin O'Donnell
 103  Li Hang
 103  Ricky Walden
 102  Ali Carter
 102  Anthony Hamilton
 100  Harvey Chandler
 100  Andrew Higginson
 100  David Lilley
 100  Matthew Stevens

Notes

References

2019
World Open
World Open (snooker)
Snooker competitions in China
World Open
World Open